Jason Crane (also known by the pseudonym JC2000) is an American drummer and trumpeter notable as a member of Rocket from the Crypt, The Black Heart Procession, and Beehive & the Barracudas.

Musical career
Crane originally performed as drummer in a band named A Day Called Zero with bassist Tobias Christensen and singer/guitarist/pianist Josh Quon. The band had one release on local label Gravity Records. Crane joined Rocket from the Crypt in 1992 as trumpeter under the pseudonym JC 2000, shortly after the release of their second album Circa: Now!. The album attracted the attention of major record labels and led to a recording contract with Interscope Records. He also performed in a side project named Rice with Rocket from the Crypt saxophonist Paul O'Beirne (Apollo 9). The group, a hardcore punk band with a horn section, also included Carlos Cañedo, Dustin "Dirty" Milsap, and Jason Soares. They sang songs about rice and released one album, Fuck You, This Is Rice, on Lookout! Records in 1992. In 1994 Crane began participating in a side project with Rocket from the Crypt singer/guitarist John Reis called Back Off Cupids. Crane played drums on most of the group's material, which was recorded intermittently from 1994 to 1999 and released in 2000 as an eponymous album.

In 1995 Rocket from the Crypt had a trio of releases: The State of Art is on Fire, Hot Charity, and Scream, Dracula, Scream! They filmed several music videos, toured internationally, and experienced a surge of popularity in the United Kingdom. In 1997 Crane reunited with Tobias Christensen in The Black Heart Procession, which also included drummer Mario Rubalcaba. He also reunited with Carlos Cañedo and Dustin Milsap in Beehive & the Barracudas, which also included Rocket from the Crypt guitarist Andy Stamets. Another side project called Loader brought together former members of A Day Called Zero and Rice, including Crane (on drums), Milsap, Jason Soares, and Josh Quon. Finally, the instrumental band Stacatto Reads included Crane on trumpet and drums along with Milsap, Soares, and John Reis.

In 1998 Rocket from the Crypt released RFTC, but Interscope turned their attention to higher-grossing acts and the band soon left the label. This was followed by the departure of longtime drummer Adam Willard from the group in early 2000. They soon regrouped, signing to Vagrant Records and bringing in Mario Rubalcaba as their new drummer. Crane continued to record and perform with Rocket from the Crypt, who released Group Sounds in 2001 and Live from Camp X-Ray in 2002. The group disbanded after playing their final performance on Halloween 2005, which was recorded and later released as R.I.P.

Discography
This section lists albums and EPs on which Crane has performed. For a more complete listing, see the Rocket from the Crypt discography.

References

External links
 Swami Records official website
 Rocket from the Crypt official website
 

American punk rock musicians
Rocket from the Crypt members
Musicians from San Diego
Living people
Place of birth missing (living people)
Back Off Cupids members
1975 births